FRES may refer to:

Flesch Reading Ease Score, a readability test
Forest-Range Environmental Study Ecosystems 
Future Rapid Effect System, a programme to deliver armoured fighting vehicles for the British Army
a Fellow of the Royal Entomological Society of London

Fres may refer to:
Fres, village on the island of Crete, Greece
Fres Oquendo (born 1973), Puerto Rican heavyweight boxer

See also
FRE (disambiguation)